William Tyrrell  may refer to:

 William Tyrrell (bishop) (1807–1879), first Anglican Bishop of Newcastle, New South Wales
 William Tyrrell, 1st Baron Tyrrell (1866–1947), British diplomat
 William Tyrrell (RAF officer) (1885–1968), Irish rugby international, military officer, and surgeon to George VI
 George William Tyrrell, Union Army officer
 Disappearance of William Tyrrell, a missing boy from Australia
 William Casper Tyrrell, "Captain W.C." Tyrrell, Texas business magnate

See also 
 Tyrrell (surname)
 Terrell (surname)